Bizetiella is a genus of sea snails, marine gastropod mollusks in the family Muricidae, the murex snails or rock snails.

Species
Species within the genus Bizetiella include:

 Bizetiella carmen (Lowe, 1935)
 Bizetiella micaela Radwin & D'Attilio, 1972
 Bizetiella shaskyi Radwin & D'Attilio, 1972

References

Muricopsinae